Bengt Nilsson (17 February 1934 – 11 May 2018) was a Swedish high jumper. In 1954 he won the Swedish and European titles and set a European record at 2.11 m; later that year he was awarded the Svenska Dagbladet Gold Medal.

Nilsson got injured at the 1956 Summer Olympics and finished only 26th. He retired from athletics shortly thereafter.

References

1934 births
2018 deaths
Swedish male high jumpers
Olympic athletes of Sweden
Athletes (track and field) at the 1956 Summer Olympics
European Athletics Championships medalists
People from Härnösand
Sportspeople from Västernorrland County
20th-century Swedish people